This is an episode list for the Canadian animated television show 6teen. The show premiered on Teletoon November 7, 2004 and ended February 11, 2010.

As of February 11, 2010, 91 episodes (plus two one-hour special episodes) of 6teen have been aired, 52 of which have been released on DVD. The first 13 episodes of Season One were also released in a DVD box set, 6teen: The Complete First Season, on November 13, 2007; however, the episodes on the DVD are not in the correct order. In the USA, 6teen Season 1 Volume 1, 6teen Dude Of The Living Dead, and 6teen Deck The Mall have been released in 2009.

When Nickelodeon and Cartoon Network aired this series, 24 episodes were pulled for having content that was considered too risqué for their respective channel's target audience (children and preteens).

On May 16, 2018, Jen's voice actor, Megan Fahlenbock, tweeted "One time 6teen reunion episode is coming ... stay tooned!  #6teenforever." Christian Potenza, Jude's voice actor, later announced that a 6teen special reunion episode is currently in the works. Tom McGillis, president of Fresh TV and one of the creators and executive producers of 6teen also confirmed the special episode, tweeting "6teen reunion episode coming soon. They've aged! #8teen". The reunion ended up being a PSA minisode about voting in the USA, and released on September 12, 2018.

Series overview

Episodes

Season 1 (2004–05)

Season 2 (2005–06)

Season 3 (2007–08)

Season 4 (2009–10)

Webisode (2018)

References

External links
 

Lists of Canadian children's animated television series episodes